Keith Brett Dambrot (born October 26, 1958) is an American college basketball coach and the current men's basketball head coach of Duquesne University.

During his high school head coaching career, he coached future NBA star LeBron James for two years. During 13 seasons of head coaching at the University of Akron, he had a regular game season 305–139 record and was the winningest coach in the program's history.

He is a three-time Mid-American Conference Coach of the Year. In 2010, he was elected into the Summit County Sports Hall of Fame, and in 2013 he won the Red Auerbach Coach of the Year Award as the country's top Jewish college basketball coach.

Early life
Dambrot was born in Akron, Ohio, and is Jewish. Dambrot's mother, Faye, was a psychology professor at the University of Akron while he was growing up. His father Sid Dambrot had played on Duquesne Dukes men's basketball basketball teams ranked No. 1 in the nation from 1952 to 1954. His uncle Irwin Dambrot played basketball for the 1950 City College of New York (CCNY) team, the only school to win both the NCAA Tournament and the NIT in the same season, and was the MVP of the NCAA tournament that season and the No. 1 draft pick (selected seventh overall) by the New York Knicks in the 1950 NBA draft.

Dambrot attended Firestone High School, playing baseball and point guard in basketball for the school teams. In college at the University of Akron, he played third base on the Akron Zips baseball team (of which he was captain and MVP) for the school, establishing what at the time was a school record for career hit by pitch, with 28. He graduated in 1982 with a degree in Management. In 1984 he earned an MBA from the University of Akron.

Early coaching career
His first basketball coaching job came while he was a college student, when he helped coach the high school junior varsity at his alma mater Firestone, and they won the Akron City Series JV championship.

Upon graduating college, he started as an assistant basketball coach at Akron.

Dambrot began his head coaching career at Division II schools Tiffin University for two seasons from 1984 to 1986 and at Ashland University for two seasons from 1989 to 1991, At Ashland, he led his team each year into the NCAA D-II Men's Basketball tournament. In between, he was an assistant coach at Eastern Michigan University.

Central Michigan University
At 32 years of age, Dambrot replaced Charlie Coles as coach of Central Michigan University for the 1991–92 season. He coached the team for two seasons, and was fired for making a controversial comment before a game against Miami University.  He had asked the players if he could use a controversial word in addressing the team before he actually did, and they agreed, but he still was fired.  He sued the university in a wrongful discrimination lawsuit, and all 11 black players on the team joined him in the suit, claiming the university's policy against discriminatory language was too vague, but he lost the suit, though the students prevailed in overturning the school's language policy.

St. Vincent-St. Mary High School
The incident at Central Michigan essentially blackballed Dambrot from college coaching. Dambrot was only able to coach at the Akron Jewish Community Center and in some summer leagues.  In 1998, he became the head coach at St. Vincent–St. Mary HS in Akron, Ohio.  During his three seasons there, he guided the Fighting Irish to a 69–10 record.  During the last two years of his tenure as coach there, future NBA star LeBron James was on his squad, and they won two consecutive state championships, as well as were nationally ranked. James took part in $1 clinics Dambrot conducted at the local Jewish Community Center. Before playing for Dambrot, James had met with him, and followed up on the accusations made about him during his stint at Central Michigan.  In his book, Shooting Stars, James said that he did not believe that Dambrot was a racist.

University of Akron
Dambrot left St. Vincent-St. Mary in 2001 to return to coaching as an assistant at the collegiate level at his alma mater, the University of Akron.  Since becoming the head coach of Akron in 2004, Dambrot led Akron to the postseason in four-straight and five of the last six seasons – participating in the NCAA Tournament in 2009, 2011 and 2013, the National Invitation Tournament in 2008 and 2006 and the College Basketball invitational (CBI) in 2010. Akron has won 20-plus games in each of the last six years – one of only 20 teams in the country to do so – and posted 19 victories in Dambrot's first season (2004–05).  Only three other schools in the nation - also Duke, Gonzaga and Kansas - had accomplished that feat. The Zips have won at least 21 games in each of the 12 seasons – a feat unmatched in program history. Additionally, Akron has competed in the Mid-American Conference tournament title game in six of the last eight years and is just the second league school to have appeared in at least five-straight finals (Miami (Ohio) 1997–2001).

In his first seven seasons in charge of the program, Akron amassed a 162–75 overall record, including an 80–36 mark in MAC play and a 91–15 tally in home games (50–8 in MAC play at home). Those 162 victories tied for the most by a MAC team and tied for 29th-best nationally during that seven-season span. In 13 seasons as a collegiate head coach he owned a 270–145 overall record. Dambrot entered the season in fifth place in league history with a .628 win percentage while coaching in the MAC (182–109 overall; 162–75 Akron, 20–34 CMU), eighth in overall wins (182), 11th in league games winning percentage (90–60) and 10th in conference wins (90).

Named the 2009 Best Mid-Major Coach by Dan Wetzel of Yahoo Sports, Dambrot's time at UA was highlighted by mentoring a total of 20 All-MAC honorees, 10 MAC All-Tournament selections, two tournament MVPs and one player of the year honor. Also during his watch, seven players were added to the school's 1,000-point scorer's list and he coached Akron's all-time assists leader (Dru Joyce, 503), all-time blocked shots leader (Romeo Travis, 165), all-time winningest player (Chris McKnight, 97 victories over a four-season span) and the all-time games played leader (Steve McNees, 141).

The list of accolades received by UA players over the last seven seasons also include Romeo Travis being named Honorable Mention All-America (the program's first such honoree since 1989) and MAC Player of the Year (first in program history) in 2007, Cedrick Middleton (2007) and Brett McKnight (2009) earning MAC Sixth Man of the Year (only two honors of that kind in program history), and Nate Linhart (2009) and Jimmy Conyers (2010) being selected as the MAC Defensive Player of the Year. Linhart also earned league tournament MVP honors in 2009. In 2011, Zeke Marshall earned league tournament MVP honors after helping the Zips to their second MAC title in three seasons.

In 2010, Dambrot was elected into the Summit County Sports Hall of Fame for his contributions at Akron St. Vincent-St. Mary High School, and at The University of Akron as both a student-athlete and head coach. He was also a finalist for the Red Auerbach Coach of the Year Award, which is awarded by the Jewish Coaches Association. In 2013, he won the Red Auerbach Coach of the Year Award as the country's top Jewish college basketball coach, and was named the MAC Coach of the Year.

Dambrot left Akron after 13 seasons, with a 305–139 record, as the winningest coach in school history. He won back-to-back Mid-American Conference regular season titles, in 2016 and 2017, and coach of the year honors those seasons. The team averaged 23.5 wins during his tenure.  His teams won 21 games or more in each of his last 12 seasons, a feat matched during that time by only Duke, Kansas and Gonzaga. In his career, Dambrot took the team to three NCAA Tournaments and five NIT appearances.

Duquesne University
On March 30, 2017, Dambrot was named the 17th head coach at Duquesne in the school's 101-year history. He signed a 7-year, $7 million contract. The Dukes had finished 10-22 the season before he took over as head coach. Duquesne improved to 16-16 while finishing 10th in the Atlantic 10 in its first season under Dambrot. In his second season as Head Coach, Dambrot led the school to its first winning record since the 2011–12 season with 19 wins and 13 losses. Duquesne ended the season sixth in the Atlantic 10, the program's best finish since it finished fourth in the 2010–11 season.

The 2019/2020 season saw an even better start for Duquesne and Dambrot as the Dukes started the season 10–0, the best start since the 1953/1954 season.  Duquesne went 11–7 in conference play and finished tied for 5th place in the A10.  The 2020 A10 Tournament and subsequent March Madness tournaments were cancelled due to the COVID-19 pandemic.

Head coaching record

College

See also
List of current NCAA Division I men's basketball coaches

References

External links
 Duquesne profile

1958 births
Living people
21st-century American Jews
Akron Zips baseball players 
Akron Zips men's basketball coaches
American men's basketball coaches
Ashland Eagles men's basketball coaches
Basketball players from Akron, Ohio
Central Michigan Chippewas men's basketball coaches
College men's basketball head coaches in the United States
Duquesne Dukes men's basketball coaches
Eastern Michigan Eagles men's basketball coaches
High school basketball coaches in Ohio
Jewish American sportspeople
Tiffin Dragons men's basketball coaches